Walter Cook may refer to:
 Walter Cook (VC) (1834–c. 1864), English recipient of the Victoria Cross for service in India during the Indian Mutiny
 Walter Cook (architect) (1846–1916), American architect of New York firm Babb, Cook & Willard
 Walter Cook (footballer) (1894–1973), English football goalkeeper
 Walter E. Cook (1888–1955), Wisconsin state assemblyman
 Walter William Spencer Cook (1888–1962), American art historian and professor

See also 
 Walter Cooke (disambiguation)